Events in the year 2021 in Curaçao.

Incumbents
 Monarch – Willem-Alexander
 Governor – Lucille George-Wout
 Prime Minister – Gilmar Pisas

Events
Ongoing — COVID-19 pandemic in Curaçao

Scheduled events
19 March – 2021 Curaçao general election.

Deaths
23 January – Lia Willems-Martina, government minister (born 1949).
7 March – Almier Godett, 38, politician; shot

References

 
2020s in Curaçao
Years of the 21st century in Curaçao
Curacao
Curacao
Curacao